Inception is a 2010 science fiction thriller film directed and written by Christopher Nolan. Released to critical and commercial success, the film was named one of the ten best films of the year by National Board of Review and American Film Institute.

Inception won the 83rd Academy Awards for Best Cinematography, Best Sound Editing, Best Sound Mixing and Best Visual Effects, and was nominated for a total of eight, including Best Picture and Best Original Screenplay. With four wins, the film tied The King's Speech—Best Picture winner—for most wins of the ceremony.

Organizations
{| class="wikitable" style="font-size:95%"
|- style="background:#ccc; text-align:center;"
! colspan="5" style="background: LightSteelBlue;" | Awards
|- style="background:#ccc; text-align:center;"
! Ceremony
! Award
! Category
! Recipients and nominees
! Result
|-style="border-top:2px solid gray;"
|rowspan=8|83rd Academy Awards
|rowspan=8|Academy Award
|Best Picture
|Emma Thomas and Christopher Nolan
|
|-
|Best Original Screenplay
|Christopher Nolan
|
|-
|Best Art Direction
|Art Direction: Guy Hendrix Dyas; Set Decoration: Larry Dias and Doug Mowat
|
|-
|Best Cinematography
|Wally Pfister
|
|-
|Best Original Score
|Hans Zimmer
|
|-
|Best Sound Editing
|Richard King
|
|-
|Best Sound Mixing
|Lora Hirschberg, Gary A. Rizzo and Ed Novick
|
|-
|Best Visual Effects
|Paul Franklin, Chris Corbould, Andrew Lockley and Peter Bebb
|
|-
|-style="border-top:2px solid gray;"
|Academy of Recording Arts and Sciences 
|Grammy Award
|Best Score Soundtrack Album For Motion Picture, Television Or Other Visual
|Hans Zimmer
|
|-style="border-top:2px solid gray;"
|American Film Institute 
|AFI Award
|Movies of the Year
|
|
|-
|-style="border-top:2px solid gray;"
|rowspan=9|British Academy of Film and Television Arts 
|rowspan=9|BAFTA Award
|Best Film
|Emma Thomas, Christopher Nolan
|
|-
|Best Director
|Christopher Nolan
|
|-
|Best Original Screenplay
|Christopher Nolan
|
|-
|Best Cinematography
|Wally Pfister
|
|-
|Best Editing
|Lee Smith
|
|-
|Best Original Music
|Hans Zimmer
|
|-
|Best Production Design
|Guy Hendrix Dyas, Larry Dias, Doug Mowat
|
|-
|Best Sound
|Richard King, Lora Hirschberg, Gary A Rizzo, Ed Novick
|
|-
|Best Special Visual Effects
|Chris Corbould, Paul Franklin, Andrew Lockley, Peter Bebb
|
|-
|-style="border-top:2px solid gray;"
| Crime Writers Association 
| Crime Thriller Awards
| Film of the Year
|Christopher Nolan
|
|-
|-style="border-top:2px solid gray;"
| Czech Lion Awards 2010| Czech Lion Award
| Best Foreign Film
|Christopher Nolan
|
|-
|-style="border-top:2px solid gray;"
|rowspan=4|Hollywood Foreign Press Association 
|rowspan=4|Golden Globe Award
|Best Motion Picture - Drama
|
|rowspan=4 
|-
|Best Director
|Christopher Nolan
|-
|Best Screenplay
|Christopher Nolan
|-
|Best Original Score
|Hans Zimmer
|-
|-style="border-top:2px solid gray;"
|rowspan=3|Hollywood Film Festival 
|rowspan=3|Hollywood Film Awards
|Movie of the Year
|
|rowspan=3 
|-
|Cinematographer of the Year
|Wally Pfister
|-
|Film Composer of the Year
|Hans Zimmer
|-
|-style="border-top:2px solid gray;"
|rowspan=6|IGN 
|rowspan=6|IGN Movie Awards
|Best Movie
|
|
|-
|Best Sci-Fi Movie
|
|
|-
|Best Director
|Christopher Nolan
|
|-
|Best Actress
|Marion Cotillard
|rowspan=3 
|-
|Best Poster
|
|-
|Best Trailer
|
|-
|-style="border-top:2px solid gray;"
|rowspan=1|Japan Academy Prize Association|rowspan=1|Japan Academy Prize
|Outstanding Foreign Language Film
|
|
|-
|-style="border-top:2px solid gray;"
|rowspan=7|2011 MTV Movie Awards|rowspan=7|MTV Movie Awards
|Best Movie
|
|
|-
|Best Scared-As-S**t Performance
|Ellen Page
|
|-
|Best Kiss
|Joseph Gordon-Levitt and Ellen Page
|rowspan=5 
|-
|Best Fight
|Joseph Gordon-Levitt vs. Hallway Attacker
|-
|Best Jaw Dropping Moment
|Leonardo DiCaprio and Ellen Page
|-
|Biggest Badass Star
|Joseph Gordon-Levitt
|-
|Best Line from a Movie
|Tom Hardy
|-
|-style="border-top:2px solid gray;"
|rowspan=11|International Press Academy 
|rowspan=11|Satellite Award
|Best Drama Film
|
|rowspan=5 
|-
|Best Director
|Christopher Nolan
|-
|Best Actor (Drama)
|Leonardo DiCaprio
|-
|Best Supporting Actress
|Marion Cotillard 
|-
|Best Original Screenplay
|Christopher Nolan
|-
|Best Art Direction & Production Design
|Guy Hendrix Dyas, Luke Freeborn, Brad Ricker, Dean Wolcott 
|rowspan=2 
|-
|Best Cinematography
|Wally Pfister 
|-
|Best Editing
|Lee Smith 
|
|-
|Best Original Score
|Hans Zimmer 
|
|-
|Best Sound
|Richard King, Ed Novick, Lora Hirschberg, Gary Rizzo 
|rowspan=2 
|-
|Best Visual Effects
|Paul J. Franklin, Chris Corbould, Andrew Lockley, Peter Bebb 
|-
|-style="border-top:2px solid gray;"
|rowspan=3|Irish Film & Television Academy 
|rowspan=3|IFTA Award
|Actor in a Supporting Role - Film
|Cillian Murphy
|rowspan=3 
|-
|International Film
|
|-
|International Actor
|Leonardo DiCaprio
|-
|-style="border-top:2px solid gray;"
|National Board of Review 
|NBR Award
|Top Ten Films
|
|
|-
|-style="border-top:2px solid gray;"
|rowspan=4|People's Choice Awards 
|rowspan=4|People's Choice Awards
|Favorite Movie
|
|rowspan=4 
|-
|Favorite Drama Movie
|
|-
|Favorite Movie Actor
|Leonardo DiCaprio
|-
|Favorite On-Screen Team
|Leonardo DiCaprio, Joseph Gordon-Levitt, Ellen Page, Tom Hardy & Dileep Rao
|-
|-style="border-top:2px solid gray;"
|rowspan=9|37th Saturn Awards|rowspan=9|Saturn Award
|Best Science Fiction Film
|
|
|-
|Best Actor
|Leonardo DiCaprio
|rowspan=3 
|-
|Best Actress
|Ellen Page
|-
|Best Supporting Actor
|Tom Hardy
|-
|Best Director
|Christopher Nolan
|rowspan=3 
|-
|Best Writing
|Christopher Nolan
|-
|Best Music
|Hans Zimmer
|-
|Best Production Design
|Guy Hendrix
|
|-
|Best Special Effects
|Paul Franklin, Chris Corbould, Andrew Lockley, and Peter Bebb
|
|-
|-style="border-top:2px solid gray;"
|rowspan=15|Scream Awards 
|rowspan=15|Scream Awards
|The Ultimate Scream
|
|rowspan=2 
|-
|Best Science Fiction Movie
|
|-
|Best Director
|Christopher Nolan
|rowspan=2 
|-
|Best Scream-play
|Christopher Nolan
|-
|Best Science Fiction Actor
|Leonardo DiCaprio
|
|-
|Best Science Fiction Actress
|Ellen Page
|
|-
|Best Supporting Actor
|Joseph Gordon-Levitt
|
|-
|Best Supporting Actress
|Marion Cotillard
|
|-
|Best Breakout Performance - Male
|Tom Hardy
|
|-
|Best Cameo
|Michael Caine
|rowspan=2 
|-
|Best Ensemble
|
|-
|Fight Scene of the Year
|Anti-Gravity Hotel Fight
|
|-
|rowspan=2 | Holy Sh*t Scene of the Year
|Freight train drives through city street
|rowspan=3 
|-
|Paris street folds over onto itself
|-
|Best F/X
|
|-
|69th World Science Fiction Convention 
|Hugo Award
|Best Dramatic presentation, Long Form
|
|
|-
|World Soundtrack Awards 2011'|World Soundtrack Award
|Best Original Score of the Year
|Hans Zimmer
|
|}

Guild awards

Critics groups

Top ten lists
The film appeared on over 273 critics' top ten lists, the second most any other film of 2010 (runner up only to The Social Network), and was named #1 on 55 critics' lists. Some of the notable critics' placement of Inception are:

 

 1st – Richard Roeper, Chicago Sun-Times 1st – Empire 1st – Kirk Honeycutt, The Hollywood Reporter 1st – Mark Kermode, BBC Radio 5 Live 1st – Kenneth Turan, Los Angeles Times (tied with The Social Network and Toy Story 3)
 1st – Bryan Reesman, MSN Movies 1st – Tasha Robinson, The A.V. Club 1st – Colin Covert, Minneapolis Star Tribune 2nd – Peter Travers, Rolling Stone 2nd – James Berardinelli, Reelviews 2nd – Christy Lemire, Associated Press
 2nd – Gregory Ellwood, HitFix 2nd – Don Kaye, MSN Movies 2nd – John P. McCarthy, Boxoffice 2nd – Bill Goodykoontz, The Arizona Republic 3rd – Stephen Holden, The New York Times 3rd – Philip French, The Observer 3rd – FX Feeney, The Village Voice 3rd – Paul Lynch, Sunday Tribune 4th – Mark Keizer, Boxoffice 4th – Keith Phipps, The A.V. Club 4th – Mike Russell, The Oregonian 4th – Claudia Puig, USA Today 5th – Clint O’Connor, The Plain Dealer (Cleveland, Ohio)
 5th – Nathan Rabin, The A.V. Club 6th – David Germain, Associated Press
 6th – Roger Ebert, Chicago Sun-Times 6th – Rene Rodriguez, Miami Herald 6th – Elizabeth Weitzman, New York Daily News 6th – Ann Hornaday, Washington Post 7th – Neil Miller, Film School Rejects 7th – Noel Murray, The A.V. Club 8th – Chris Vognar, Dallas Morning News 8th – Luke Y. Thompson, E! Online 8th – Mike Scott, New Orleans Times-Picayune 9th – Drew McWeeny, HitFix 10th – Peter Hartlaub, San Francisco Chronicle 10th – Tim Robey, The Telegraph 10th – J. Hoberman, The Village Voice''

Notes

References

External links 
 

Lists of accolades by film